The 1984 Virginia Slims of Florida was a women's tennis tournament played on outdoor clay courts in Palm Beach Gardens, Florida in the United States that was part of the Category 3 tier of the 1984 Virginia Slims World Championship Series.  It was the inaugural edition of the tournament, held from 12 March through 18 March 1984.  First-seeded Chris Evert-Lloyd won the singles title.

Finals

Singles
 Chris Evert-Lloyd defeated  Bonnie Gadusek 6–0, 6–1
 It was Mrs. Evert-Lloyd's first singles title of 1984 and the 127th of her career.

Doubles
 Betsy Nagelsen /  Anne White defeated  Rosalyn Fairbank /  Candy Reynolds 2–6, 6–2, 6–2
 It was Ms. Nagelsen's first title of 1984 and the twelfth of her career.  It was White's second title of 1984 and the second of her career.

References

External links
 ITF tournament edition details

Virginia Slims of Florida
Virginia Slims of Florida
Virginia Slims of Florida
Virginia Slims of Florida
Virginia Slims of Florida